Diphyllostoma fimbriatum is a species of false stag beetle in the family Diphyllostomatidae.

References

Further reading

 

Scarabaeiformia
Articles created by Qbugbot
Beetles described in 1901